Gregory I was the Count of Tusculum sometime between 954 and 1012. Consul et dux 961, vir illustrissimus 980, praefectus navalis 999. He was the son of Alberic II (son of Alberic I of Spoleto and Marozia), and Alda of Vienne (daughter of Hugh, King of Italy and his second wife, Alda (or Hilda)). His half-brother was Pope John XII.

He held the cities of Galeria, Arce, and Preneste and the title count palatine, the palace referred to being that of the Lateran. He was the first to carry the title "Count of Tusculum" and he passed it to all his descendants. They also received the titles of excellentissimus vir''' (most excellent man) and apostolic rector of Sant'Andrea, which Gregory received in 980. In 981, Gregory bore the title Romanorum consul, dux et senator: "Consul, duke, and senator of the Romans."

As well as being an intimate and ally of the popes, especially Sylvester II, Gregory also served as praefectus navalis'' of Holy Roman Emperors Otto I and Otto II. However, on 6 February 1001, he was named "Head of the Republic" by the Romans for leading the revolt against Otto III and expelling the Crescentii. In 1002, the latter returned to power and he had to renounce his title.

His death is attested before the 11 June 1012, when his successor, Theophylact, was elected Pope.

Marriage and issue
By his wife Maria (died 1013) he had three sons and a daughter:
 Theophylact, who became Pope Benedict VIII.
 Alberic III who succeeded him in Tusculum and in his titles.
 Romanus, who became Pope John XIX
 Marozia III, who married Thrasimund III of Spoleto. Together, the houses of Tusculum and Spoleto were the dominant secular powers in the central Italian peninsula, the one representative of the imperial power and the other, Gregory's, of papal.

Sources
Foundation of Medieval Genealogy: Northern Italy — 21. Counts of Tusculum.
10th-century births
1012 deaths
10th-century Italian nobility
People of medieval Rome
Medieval Roman consuls
Counts of Tusculum